Aleksander Antoni Chłopek (born 13 December 1946 in Chrzanów) is a Polish politician. He was elected to Sejm on 25 September 2005 getting 5366 votes in 29 Gliwice district, candidating from the Law and Justice list.

From 1978 to 1981 he was a member of the Polish United Workers' Party.

See also
Members of Polish Sejm 2005-2007

External links
Aleksander Chłopek - parliamentary page - includes declarations of interest, voting record, and transcripts of speeches.

1946 births
Living people
People from Chrzanów
Polish United Workers' Party members
Democratic Union (Poland) politicians
Freedom Union (Poland) politicians
Law and Justice politicians
Members of the Polish Sejm 2005–2007
Members of the Polish Sejm 2007–2011